George Anthony Curry (December 22, 1937 – October 16, 2006) was a Bahamian professional baseball outfielder, who appeared in Major League Baseball (MLB) for the Philadelphia Phillies (1960–61) and Cleveland Indians (1966). The second Bahamian to reach the major leagues (after André Rodgers), Curry also played cricket and association football in his native country before turning to baseball.

Curry's 12-year (1957–68) professional career got off to a promising start. He batted .333, .293, and .313 during his first three Minor League Baseball (MiLB) seasons, with extra-base power. In 1959, in the Class A Eastern League, Curry belted 49 doubles, nine triples and 23 home runs, with 90 runs batted in (RBI). He led the Eastern League in runs scored and hits, and was named Most Valuable Player.

The following year, Curry spent the entire season on the Phillies' major league roster and appeared in 95 games — 55 of them as a starting outfielder. Benefitting from a torrid start, he was second in the National League (NL) batting race on May 14, peaking at .388 before striking out in his last at bat that day for .380; in that same game, Curry hit his first- and second-MLB homer, at Cincinnati’s Crosley Field, against Jay Hook — and was still at .336, after his first 42 games (through June 23). Curry held on above .300 on July 6, but slumped at the plate and ended the season batting .261 with 64 hits, six home runs, and 34 RBI.

1960 was to be Curry’s only full season in the big leagues. Then, when the regular season began, Curry collected only seven hits in 36 at bats before being demoted to Triple-A. As events turned out, his Philadelphia career was over.

Curry was traded to the Cleveland Indians' organization in March 1962, and he spent much of the rest of his pro career in Triple-A. A strong performance for the Portland Beavers in  earned Curry a six-week call-up to Cleveland in June, but he collected only two hits and three bases on balls in 19 plate appearances as a pinch hitter, in Curry’s last appearance in the major leagues.

In all or parts of three big-league seasons, Curry played in 129 games, with 297 at bats, 33 runs, 73 hits, 16 doubles, two triples, six home runs, 40 RBI, 20 walks, .246 batting average, .295 on-base percentage, .374 slugging percentage, 111 total bases, one sacrifice hit, one sacrifice fly, and two intentional walks.

On October 16, 2006, Curry died in his home city of Nassau at the age of 68.

References

External links

Tony Curry at Pura Pelota (Venezuelan Professional Baseball League)

1937 births
2006 deaths
Bahamian expatriate sportspeople in Mexico
Bahamian expatriate baseball players in the United States
Buffalo Bisons (minor league) players
Charleston Indians players
Charros de Jalisco players
Cleveland Indians players
Expatriate baseball players in Mexico
High Point-Thomasville Hi-Toms players
Indios de Oriente players
Jacksonville Suns players
Leones del Caracas players
Bahamian expatriate baseball players in Venezuela
Major League Baseball outfielders
Major League Baseball players from the Bahamas
Oklahoma City 89ers players
Philadelphia Phillies players
Portland Beavers players
Seattle Angels players
Sportspeople from Nassau, Bahamas
Tampa Tarpons (1957–1987) players
Tiburones de La Guaira players
Williamsport Grays players